is a Japanese manga series written and illustrated by Taku Kuwabara. It has been serialized in Kodansha's seinen manga magazine good! Afternoon since June 2016 and has been collected in fourteen tankōbon volumes as of December 2022. The manga is published digitally in English by Kodansha USA under the Kodansha Comics imprint.

An original net animation adaptation by Polygon Pictures was released on Netflix Japan on January 9, 2020. The same day, the series' first episode premiered on Fuji TV's +Ultra programming block, and continued weekly until March 26, 2020, with the final episode's television airing. It was followed by an international Netflix release in April 2020.

Characters

Media

Manga
Drifting Dragons is written and illustrated by Taku Kuwabara. It started its publication in Kodansha's good! Afternoon on June 7, 2016. Kodansha has published the series into individual tankōbon volumes. The first volume was released on November 7, 2016. As of December 7, 2022, fourteen volumes have been released.

In North America, Kodansha USA announced the digital release of the manga in November 2017. They also announced the print release of the manga in March 2019. The first volume was published on December 17, 2019.

Volume list

Anime
An anime ONA adaptation was announced on March 15, 2019. The series was animated by Polygon Pictures and directed by Tadahiro Yoshihira, with Makoto Uezu handling series composition, Kyoko Kotani designing the characters, and Masaru Yokoyama composing the music. The series' 12-episode run premiered on Netflix Japan on January 9, 2020, which was the same day the series began its weekly television run on Fuji TV's +Ultra programming block, as well as KTV, THK, TNC, UHB, and BS Fuji. Yoh Kamiyama performed the series' opening theme song "Gunjō", while Akai Ko-en performed the series' ending theme song "Zettai Reido". It ran for 12 episodes. The series premiered on Netflix worldwide on April 30, 2020.

Episode list

Awards
Drifting Dragons has been nominated for the 52nd Seiun Award for the Media category in 2021.

References

External links
  at Netflix
  
 

2020 anime ONAs
2020 anime television series debuts
+Ultra
Adventure anime and manga
Anime series based on manga
Cooking in anime and manga
Fantasy anime and manga
Films with screenplays by Makoto Uezu
Fuji TV original programming
Japanese-language Netflix original programming
Kodansha manga
Netflix original anime
Polygon Pictures
Seinen manga
Toho Animation